Joseph Darwell (17 July 1891 – 9 September 1953) was an English professional rugby league footballer who played in the 1910s and 1920s.

Background
Joe Darwell was born in Leigh, Lancashire, England, and he died aged  in Leigh, Lancashire, England.

Playing career

Club career
Joe Darwell made 297 appearances for Leigh, scoring 30 tries and 11 goals.

International honours
Joe Darwell won caps for England while at Leigh in 1922 against Wales, and in 1923 against Wales (2 matches), and won caps for Great Britain while at Leigh in 1924 against Australia (3 matches), and New Zealand (2 matches).

Challenge Cup Final appearances
Joe Darwell played left-, i.e. number 11, in Leigh's 13-0 victory over Halifax in the 1920–21 Challenge Cup Final during the 1920–21 season at The Cliff, Broughton on Saturday 30 April 1921, in front of a crowd of 25,000.

References

External links

1891 births
1953 deaths
England national rugby league team players
English rugby league players
Great Britain national rugby league team players
Leigh Leopards players
Rugby league players from Leigh, Greater Manchester
Rugby league second-rows